Carlo Maria Maggi (Milan, 1630 – Milan, 1699) was an Italian scholar, writer and poet. Despite being an Accademia della Crusca affiliate, he gained his fame as an author of "dialectal" works (poems and plays) in Milanese language, for which he is considered the father of Milanese literature. Maggi's work was a major inspiration source for later Milanese scholars such as Carlo Porta and Giuseppe Parini.

Biography 
A native of Milan, Carlo Maria Maggi was secretary to the Senate of that city, and professor of Greek in the Palatine School. He was a close friend of Muratori, who edited his Rime Varie in 4 vols. at Milan in 1700. A larger edition was published in 1708 at Venice in 6 vols., entitled Poesie Varie. Maggi had already published a single volume with the title Rime Varie at Turin and Florence in 1688. Finally there appeared a volume entitled Rime e Prose at Venice in 1719.

Works 

His prominent works belong to the commedia dell'arte theatrical genre. Some of Maggi's most famous plays in Milanese are Il manco male (1695), Il Barone di Birbanza (1696), I consigli di Meneghino (1697), Il falso filosofo (1698), and Concorso de' Meneghini (1699). This last work may be considered as a sort of manifesto of dialectal poetry, as it explicitly celebrates the virtues of the Milanese language: che apposta la pär fä / par dì la veritä ("which seems as if it was specifically designed to tell the truth"). This equation between the Milanese language (and people) and sincerity is clearly embodied in the commedia character of Meneghino, which is supposedly Maggi's creation, and was later developed by other authors (most notably Carlo Porta) to eventually become a prominent symbol of Milan and the Milanese for antonomasia. Another recurring theme of Milanese literature first established by Maggi's works is the celebration of the verzee (Milan's vegetable market) as the place where the spirit of the city was most genuinely expressed.

Footnotes

External links 
 

Western Lombard language
Italian poets
Italian male poets
Commedia dell'arte
Writers from Milan
Culture in Milan
1699 deaths
1630 births